The Cagayan State University (CSU) is the largest state institution of higher learning in the Cagayan Valley Region, in terms of enrollment and a number of curricular program offerings. The university was established through Presidential Decree 1436, later amended by Republic Act 8292 by the integration of all publicly supported higher education institutions in the province of Cagayan.

The university is composed of eight campuses in the growth areas in the three congressional districts of Cagayan; the Aparri, Lal-Lo and Gonzaga campuses in the 1st District; the Piat, Lasam and Sanchez-Mira campuses in the 2nd District; and in the 3rd District, the Andrews and Carig campuses in Tuguegarao City. Each campus is headed by an executive officer (CEO) except in Andrews Campus, where the university president concurrently acts as the CEO. The seat of governance of the university is at the Andrews Campus, where the central administration holds office.

History

The Cagayan State University (CSU) is the first and only state-run comprehensive institution of higher learning in Cagayan. It has shared its historic contribution to the development of tertiary education in the Philippines.

Presidential Decree 1436, signed on June 11, 1978, created the Cagayan State University by merging two existing state colleges: the Cagayan Valley College of Arts & Trades (CVCAT) at Tuguegarao and the Northern Luzon State College of Agriculture (NLSCA) at Piat.

Rationalized the issues of the former Ministry of Education, Culture and Sports (MECS) were made an integral part of the university system. These were the Aparri Institute of Technology (AIT), Bukig National Agricultural and Technical School (BNATS), Aparri School of efficiency and effectiveness, college courses of other smaller institutions that were under the supervision and control of Arts and Trades (ASAT), Cagayan Valley Agricultural College (CVAC), Sanchez Mira Rural Vocational School (SMRVS), Western Cagayan School of Arts and Trades (WCSAT) and Gonzaga National Agricultural and Technical School (GNATS).

These nine pre-existing state institutions were distributed throughout the entire length and breadth of the province of Cagayan. Their founding years and laws passed signifying their original establishment. It may be noted that the various merger schools began as elementary or technical secondary schools reflecting the stage of educational needs of the communities where and when they are located and originally established at the time.

On January 3, 1979, Dr. Manuel T. Corpus of the University of the Philippines- Davao City was assumed as president of the university. Then, on January 5, 1979, the first staff meeting was held where the AD HOC Committee was organized as nuclei for the university administration. Various officers were designated in acting capacities, who were drawn out from the two-state colleges (CVCAT and NLSCA).

The CSU Central Administration Office was established in the CVCAT unit until the Gonzaga unit was developed as a main campus where the operation was centralized. The AD HOC committee met and the monthly regular staff meeting was launched in the BNATS unit.

To uplift the educational qualifications of the faculty, the Faculty and Staff Development Program was set up in the form of graduate programs effective summer of 1979. The come-on was a fifty percent discount on tuition fees.

On April 1–4, 1979, the First Academic Council Work - Conference was conducted at the Aparri Institute of Technology (ATI). The council designed the following policies: curricula for various courses; proposed courses to be offered in each unit; policies on recruitment, employment, and promotion of faculty; guidelines for faculty benefits, rules on discipline and leaves; guidelines on faculty load and faculty development; requirements for admission and scholarship of students, research and extension programs.

On September 29, 1979, the board of regents authorized the transfer of college courses from the Aparri School of Arts & Trades (ASAT) to the AIT campus. This reduced the number of campuses from nine to eight. These campuses adopted the nomenclature approved by the board on February 25, 1980, as follows:

 VCAT-CSU Tuguegarao City
 SMRVS-CSU Sanchez Mira
 WCSAT-CSU Lasam
 BNATS-CSU Bukig
 GNATS-CSU Gonzaga
 NLSCA-CSU Piat
 CVAC-CSU Lallo
 AIT-CSU Aparri

The first organizational chart of CSU took effect on October 26, 1981, upon the approval of the board of regents. This policy decision made possible the re-organization of the colleges and the approval of the designation of officials at the Central Administration, campus, and college levels.

On July 11, 1983, Dr. Joselito Jara was appointed as the first vice president for academic affairs. Then on July 27, 1983, the approval of the proposal to open the College of Medicine in the university by the board of regents marked a milestone in the curricular development of CSU. The board directed the administration to make arrangements with the then Cagayan Valley Regional Hospital (CVRH), now Cagayan Valley Medical Center (CVMC) to become the laboratory of the proposed college. The transfer of Central Administration from the Caritan campus to the Carig campus, the new site of CSU at Tuguegarao, was undertaken on June 11, 1984. The old administration building in Caritan became the Graduate School and the College of Arts and Sciences Building. Another milestone was the implementation of the integration into the university system of the secondary departments of CSU at Gonzaga, CSU at Lallo, CSU at Sanchez Mira, and CSU at Aparri on July 10, 1984. MECS regional director, Magdalena Castillo turned over formally to President Manuel T. Corpus, four high schools on December 20, 1984. The president of the Philippines approved the integration on March 17, 1983.

On May 8, 1989, Honorable Lourdes Quisumbing, the then secretary of the Department of Education Culture and Sports (DECS) sworn into office Dr. Armando Cortes as the first Cagayano president of CSU. Professor Monserrat G. Babaran was also appointed as the second vice president for academic affairs in June 1992 after Dr. Jara’s term. On March 1, 1996, to December 30, 1998, Father Ranhillo C. Aquino became the vice president of the university.

In June 1992, the office of the dean of the College of Medicine was set up in preparation for its opening in the school year 1993–1994. Dr. Gilbert Gamez, erstwhile dean of the University of Santo Tomas (UST) College of Medicine, was appointed as the first dean of the college. As the university programs expand, a university-wide reorganization was undertaken in July 1992.

On May 5, 1995, Dr. Armando B. Cortes was reappointed as president of the university. The reorganization of the top administration took place on February 27, 1996. In this same year, the governing board of the university resolved to suspend the operation of CSU at Bukig in Western Aparri because of the low enrolment that made it a non-feasible continued operation. This aspect of the history of the university is of particular importance relative to the evaluation of efficiency and effective performance.

On February 23, 1999, the board granted the university Administration the authority to offer a Bachelor of Laws and Letters (LLB) to commence the School Year 1999–2000.

In response to the thrust and vision of Region 02 and to provide leadership in livestock development, the board granted the university administration the offering of Veterinary Medicine and Medical Technology courses effective School Year 1999–2000.

On May 7, 2001, the then vice president for academic affairs, Dr. Eleuterio C. De Leon, was appointed by the board of regents as the officer-in-charge of the university. During his term, the board approved the university’s decision to phase down the enrollment in the high school department and to limit the admission of first-year high school students to Piat, Lallo, and Gonzaga campuses to 500 students only.

A reorganization of top administration took place that paved the way for the search for the different campus deans, now the campus executive officers.

On March 8, 2004, through Resolution No. 151, s. 2004, the board appointed Dr. Roger P. Perez, as the 3rd university president. On March 15, 2004, Dr. Perez assumed official duty at the Central Administration with all the powers, rights, privileges and responsibilities accorded him. Another organizational structure that would readily respond to the actual needs of the university and be attuned to the relevance of its existence and thrust of the new administration was then conceptualized.

Rationalizing its intent for a lean but mean organization. The structure has maintained three vice president positions with the third important vice president position having an added program under its domain, the Business Affairs Program. The new structure also proposed the creation of the positions of internal auditors under the office of the president. The office of the deputy dean of instruction was likewise created to implement the virtualization of curricular offerings.

To further rationalize the structure of the organization which is in consonance with a lean but mean operation, the administration has cut the number of vice-presidents from three to two, that of the vice-president for instruction, research, and extension and vice-president for administration and business.

At present, there are eight campuses under the university system. All campuses continue to operate as complementary satellites of the university. Although difficult at times, the unique arrangement of a multi-campus institution, which has prevailed over an ideal compact university being located in one site, is succeeding in terms of providing educational access and equity to its rural communities. On the other hand, owing to the peculiarities of the geographical diversity and multi-ethnicity of its people and socioeconomic, educational, and political conditions obtained in its catchment areas, the CSU institutional structures and arrangements are functioning well.

Today, CSU is present in six sites outside Tuguegarao which are located at Sanchez Mira, Lasam, Aparri, Lallo, Gonzaga, and Piat so that the original intent of providing democratized tertiary education in the countryside is felt in the whole region specifically in Cagayan.

The university offers courses in liberal arts, social sciences, law, medicine and allied professions, business and economics, natural sciences, engineering, technology, agriculture and fisheries and teaching, among others. It offers the most graduate and undergraduate courses of all the universities in the province of Cagayan.

In March 2012, Dr. Romeo R. Quilang, former president of the Isabela State University (ISU), was elected by the CSU board of regents to serve as the CSU System's fourth president.

Administration

Board of regents
The governance of the university is vested in the board of regents of the Cagayan State University (or Lupon ng mga Rehente in Filipino) and is commonly abbreviated as BOR. The board, with its 12 members, is the highest decision-making body of the CSU system.

A commissioner of the Commission on Higher Education (CHED) serves as the board's chairperson, while the president of Cagayan State University is the vice-chairperson. The chairpersons of the Committees of Higher Education of the Senate and the House of Representatives are members of the CSU board of regents which are concurrent with their functions as committee chairpersons.
The president of the University Student Government also serves as student regent, while the faculty regent is likewise nominated by the faculty members of the whole university. Alumni are represented by the president of the CSU Alumni Association. Two members of the board come from the private sector.

President of the Cagayan State University

The president of the Cagayan State University is elected for a single six-year term by the university's twelve-member board of regents. As of 2004, there were already 2 that served as president of the university.
The newly elected president of CSU is Hon. Romeo R. Quilang, Ph.D.. Just before he was appointed as CSU president, he served as the president of the Isabela State University. Quilang assumed his office, replacing Perez, and his four-year term expires in 2016.

Vice presidents of the Cagayan State University

The university has three vice presidents, each heading a component of the university's key concerns.

Campus executive officers (CEO) of CSU

Each campus is headed, for purposes of administration, by a campus executive officer, but the ultimate authority is the university president. The university president concurrently acts as the CEO of the Andrews Campus.

Degree programs

Graduate school

Dean: Manuel Tan.

 Ph.D. in Development Education
 Ph.D. in Education Major in: Language Education, Science Education, Educational Management
 MS Teaching Major in: Biology, Chemistry & Physics
 Master of Arts in Education Major in: Mathematics, Filipino, Educational Management, English, Social Science, Physical Education Health & Music
 Master of Science in Crop Science
 Master of Science in Animal Science
 Master of Arts in Guidance & Counselling
 Master of Arts in Psychology
 MS in Information Technology
 Master in Information Technology (Non-Thesis)
 Doctor in Public Administration

College of Agriculture

Dean: Ricardo S. Casauay, Ph. D.

 Bachelor of Science in agriculture
 Certificate in Agriculture (2 years)
 Bachelor of Science in Agricultural Technology
 Diploma in Agricultural Technology (3 years)

College of Allied Health Sciences

Dean: Dorina D. Sabatin RMT, MPH, CBO

 Bachelor of Science in Medical Technology/Medical Laboratory Science
 Bachelor of Science in Respiratory Therapy
 Bachelor of Science in Public Health
 Bachelor of Science in Nutrition and Dietetics

College of Arts & Sciences

Dean: Dr.Jane R. Sambrana .

 Bachelor of Science in Physics
 Bachelor of Science in Chemistry
 Bachelor of Science in Biology
 Bachelor of Science in Entrepreneurship
 Bachelor of Science in Environmental Science
 Bachelor of Science in Guidance & Counselling
 Bachelor of Science in Mathematics
 Bachelor of Science in Police Administration
 Bachelor of Science in Psychology
 Bachelor of Science in Industrial and Commercial Communications
 Bachelor of Arts in Economics
 Bachelor of Arts in English
 Bachelor of Arts in Mass Communication
 Bachelor of Arts in Political Science

College of Business Entrepreneurship & Accountancy

Dean: Emerita P. Geron, CPA, MBA, Ph.D.

 Bachelor of Science in Accountancy
 Bachelor of Science in Accounting Technology
 Bachelor of Science in Business Administration (BSBA-FM, BSBA-MM)
 Bachelor of Science in Legal Management
 Bachelor of Science in Entrepreneurship

College of Education

Dean: Panfilo Canay, Ph.D.

 Bachelor of Secondary Education
 Bachelor of Elementary Education
 Bachelor of Technical Teacher Education
Certificate Program for Teacher Education

College of Engineering

Dean: Engr. Audy R. Quebral 
 Bachelor of Science in Chemical Engineering
 Bachelor of Science in Electrical Engineering
 Bachelor of Science in Computer Engineering
 Bachelor of Science in Civil Engineering
 Bachelor of Science in Electronics and Communications Engineering
 Bachelor of Science in Agricultural Engineering

College of Fisheries

Dean: Prof. Wilma Q. Chua, MS.

 Bachelor of Science in Fisheries
 Bachelor of Science in Marine Science

College of Hospitality & Industry Management

Dean: Lourdes Judy B. Luyun, M.A

 Bachelor of Science in Hospitality Industry Management
 Certificate in Housekeeping (1 year)
 Certificate in Food & Beverage Service (2 years)
 Front Office Management & Procedures (3 years)

College of Information & Computing Sciences

Dean: Billy Javier, DIT

 Bachelor of Science in Information Technology (BSIT)
 Bachelor of Science in Computer Science (BSCS)
 Bachelor of Multimedia Arts (BMMA)
Bachelor of Science in Library Information System (BSLIS)
Bachelor of Science in Information System (BSIS)

College of Law

Dean: Atty. Placido Sabban

 Bachelor of Laws and Letters

College of Medicine and Surgery

Dean: Noelyn Bernal, MD, MPH, MPA

 Doctor of Medicine and Surgery MBBS

College of Public Administration

Dean: Dennis Bacuyag, DPA

 Bachelor of Science in Public Administration

College of Technology

Dean: Aurelio Caldez, Ph.D.
 Bachelor of Science in Industrial Technology
 Certificate in Industrial Technology (2 years)
 Certificate in Industrial Technology (2 years)
 Certificate in Industrial Technology (2 years)
 Degree holder in Industrial Technology (4 years)

College of Veterinary Medicine

Dean: Dr. Roel Calagui, DVM, MPH

 Doctor of Veterinary Medicine

Amenities

Infrastructure
The current school year was a witness to constructive changes and infrastructure developments across the different campuses of Cagayan State University. A series of "circa 50" buildings, which serve not only as institutional facilities but as aesthetic icons, representing the university motto: "Educating for the Best", is now in the final phase of their construction process.

Moreover, other physical facilities in the university are facing major rehabilitation specifically in CSU Andrews is the "show window" of CSU.

Physical improvement within the eight campuses of the university is evident and is geared at developing and encouraging higher aspirations among its poor students. Modern buildings and comfort rooms were put up to deliver the necessary service to students all over CSU.

Electronic Library
With the vision of President Perez, the university decided to subscribe to Academic OneFile for its E-Library, making it the first university in the region to have such a facility. It was inaugurated on February 14, 2011.

Students
A key institution in the university is the strong Mass Communication program of the university that is responsible for the production of radio and television programs giving public viewership to the university's activities, furnishing the public regularly with information on the university, and is the source of the information in this article.  Inspired by Dr. Roger Matalang, the Mass Communication program has been one of the most distinguished programs of the university.

The university currently has an enormous population of 32,000 on its eight campuses. One distinctive feature of the university is the innovative scheme introduced by Dr. Perez: rationalized fees.  Under this scheme, students pay no tuition fees.  They pay, however, fiduciary fees that range from two thousand to three thousand pesos per semester, allocated for specific purposes such as a library, laboratory facilities, infrastructure development, etc.  The university also boasts WiFi access to all its students and professors as well as an e-Library to which all students and professors whether on or out of campus can gain access.

It has speech laboratories in the Andrews, Carig, and Aparri campuses.  Although it is still completing its engineering laboratories, acquisitions in this area have already been considerable.

Organizations, fraternities and sororities
 The CSU Communicator - the official student publication of Cagayan State University Andrews
LFS - a progressive nationalist student organization
 Rodeo Club Philippines - a college-based student organization exclusively for veterinary medicine students.

Culture, sports and traditions 
It is the only university (Tuguegarao Campuses) that has its own extensive system of jeepney transportation owing to its geographic location. Alongside the use of Jeepney is the use of tricycles.

The Cagayan State University Chorale Ensemble, under the direction of the vice-president for academic affairs, Fr. Aquino, has gone to places including Malaysia, Macau, Busan City in South Korea, and Rome.  It has also performed in concerts throughout the country and has performed with the University of Santo Tomas Symphony Orchestra.

The Athena Dance Troupe and the Athena Rondalla, under the direction of Dr. Chita Ramos, have gained popularity and are frequently invited for performances.  They feature indigenous Filipino and regional dances as well as music produced by local instruments.

The Tanghalang CSU is directed by Dr. Shamon Abraham, University Director of Culture and the Arts, as a one-time member of the Filipinescas.  He was formerly a cultural director at the University of Saint Louis Tuguegarao.

Affiliations
CSU is a member of the Philippine Association of State Universities and Colleges (PASUC) and its athletic Association, the State Colleges and Universities Athletic Association (SCUAA), and participates in all events. The CSU Maroons.

Noted alumni and professors 
 Dr. Eligio B. Orteza Jr., 1981 magna cum laude alumnus of CSU, Professional mechanical engineer; Master of Science in Mechanical Engineering and Doctor Of Philosophy (Ph.D.) degrees in Mechanical Engineering from Stanford University, Palo Alto, California, 1990. Currently a scholar cohort of the graduate school of Center for Faith and Culture with the University of St. Thomas, Houston, Texas --- investigating on the convergence of science, technology, American culture and faith.
  Jose Guzman, Ph.D. in Agricultural Engineering, Agricultural Engineer, Associate Professor; placed 4th in the Licensure Examination, 1983
 James Cabildo, agricultural engineer, alumnus and Assistant Professor; placed 4th in the Licensure Examination, 1992
 Joseph Cabalbag, civil engineer, alumnus and instructor; Placed 19th in the Licensure Examination, 1999
 Mark Gil Hizon, agricultural engineer, alumnus; placed 3rd in the Licensure Examination, 2000
 Dennis B. Mercado. structural engineer, alumnus; placed 9th in the Licensure Examination, 2006
 Elmer Tattao. electrical engineer, alumnus; placed 1st in the Licensure Examination, 2008
 Rudolf Vecaldo Teacher, alumnus and instructor; placed 2nd in the Licensure Examination for Teachers 2008
 Jun Cosmiano Civil engineer, alumnus; placed 4th in the Licensure Examination 2008
 Sherwin Maruquin. agricultural engineer, alumnus; placed 1st in Licensure Examination, 2009.
 Jayson Tee. agricultural engineer, alumnus; placed 6th in Licensure Examination, 2010.

Distinguished professors include:

 Dr. Rogelio Matalang who has distinguished himself in Mass Media, organizing several local FM stations, conceptualizing the Mass Communication program of the Cagayan State University, and establishing links with Kosin University in South Korea.
 Fr. Ranhilio Aquino: dean of the Graduate School of Law of San Beda College and chair of the Department of Jurisprudence and Legal Philosophy, Philippine Judicial Academy, Supreme Court of the Philippines; author and international and national lecturer.
 Dr. Febe Gamiao-Paat: a clinical psychologist who has streamlined and organized the guidance services of the university;
 Dr. Edith Pagulayan: at one time a key administrator at St. Paul University Philippines, presently Dean of Instruction; a licensed social worker;
 Prof. Arthur Ibanez: campus executive officer of the Carig Campus who passed the screening procedures for structural engineering specialist;
 Dr. Teresa Dimalanta: the only professor in the region who holds the degree Ph.D. Mathematics.
 Dr. Marcelo Raquepo finished his Ph.D. in Evaluative Education from the University of the Philippines and is the university's foremost authority on research and statistics.
 Dr. Nelia Cauilan, currently faculty regent, has published numerous types of research and has been commissioned by several agencies, associations, and NGOs to conduct research studies that have been highly acclaimed;
 Dr. Lilia Tamayao has made her mark in linking with local government; the holder of a Doctor of Public Administration degree, she has successfully bridged the gap between academe and government with her numerous innovative proposals as well as actualized agreements.

Campuses
Cagayan State University - Aparri Campus
Cagayan State University - Carig Campus
Cagayan State University - Andrews Campus
Cagayan State University - Gonzaga Campus
Cagayan State University - Lallo Campus
Cagayan State University - Lasam Campus
Cagayan State University - Piat Campus
Cagayan State University - Sanchez Mira Campus
Cagayan State University - Solana Campus

References

External links
 Cagayan State University System
Cagayan State University

Universities and colleges in Cagayan
State universities and colleges in the Philippines
Education in Tuguegarao
Establishments by Philippine presidential decree